Pholcoides is a genus of Asian crevice weavers that was first described by Carl Friedrich Roewer in 1960.  it contains only three species: P. afghana, P. monticola, and P. seclusa.

References

Araneomorphae genera
Filistatidae
Spiders of Asia
Taxa named by Carl Friedrich Roewer